Adam Peterson (born July 16, 1974) is a former professional tennis player from the United States.

Biography

Early career
Peterson, who grew up in Orange County, California, made the boys' doubles semi-finals at both the 1990 and 1992 US Open junior competitions. 

A USC Trojans player, he was a member of NCAA title winning sides in 1993 and 1994. While still an amateur he was given a wildcard into the main draw at Indian Wells in 1995. He won the singles and doubles events at the 1996 ITA Summer Championships, formerly known as the US Amateur Championships.

Professional tennis
From 1996, he competed professionally, primarily as a doubles specialist, reaching a career best ranking of 102. 

During his career he won a total of three Challenger titles, all in doubles. At a Challenger tournament in Dallas in 1998 he and partner Mitch Sprengelmeyer defeated the Bryan brothers. His most-noted singles performance on tour came at Challenger level, a win over Nicolás Massú at the Binghamton Challenger in 1999.

Peterson made semi-finals of ATP Tour tournaments at Boston and Los Angeles in 1999. At the tournament in Los Angeles, which he played beside Martin Damm, the pair overcame top seeds Leander Paes and Jonas Björkman in the quarter-finals.

At Grand Slam level, he twice played in the main draw of the men's doubles. At the 1999 US Open he and partner Jan-Michael Gambill made it to the second round, where they were beaten by the world's top-ranked doubles pair, Leander Paes and Mahesh Bhupathi. His other appearance was the 2000 Australian Open, with Michael Sell.

Coaching
Peterson retired from tennis at the end of the 2000 season and began a career in coaching. He best-known for his stints as coach of Lindsay Davenport and has also coached other top female players including Madison Keys, Samantha Stosur and Coco Vandeweghe. 

Since 2012, he has been the USTA lead national coach for women's tennis.

Challenger titles

Doubles: (3)

References

External links
 
 

1974 births
Living people
American male tennis players
American tennis coaches
Sportspeople from Fullerton, California
USC Trojans men's tennis players
Tennis people from California